Eugoa trifasciata is a moth of the family Erebidae, subfamily Arctiinae. The species was first described by Snellen in 1880. It is found on Sumatra and Borneo. It is found in a wide range of lowland forest habitats, including heath forests and regenerating alluvial forests.

References

trifasciata
Nudariina
Moths of Borneo
Moths described in 1880